Geraldina (minor planet designation: 300 Geraldina) is a large Main belt asteroid. It was discovered by Auguste Charlois on October 3, 1890, in Nice. The origin of the name is unknown. The orbital plane is tilted at an angle of 0.73° to the plane of the ecliptic.

References

External links 
 
 

000300
Discoveries by Auguste Charlois
Named minor planets
18901003